Ratingen is a town in the district of Mettmann in North Rhine-Westphalia, Germany. It lies in the northwestern part of Berg about 12 km northeast of Düsseldorf.

Administration
With a communal reform of 1975 the independent municipalities of Breitscheid, Eggerscheidt, Hösel, Lintorf (seat Angerland) as well as the local part of Homberg and the municipality of Homberg-Meiersberg (seat Hubbelrath) were added into the city of Ratingen.

History
Ratingen was settled before 849. Since the Middle Ages, the Ratingen area belonged to the count and later dukes of Berg. On December 11, 1276 the settlement received city rights. Ratingen was one of the four places of Berg which experienced an economic boom in the end of the Middle Ages, but slowed during the Thirty Years' War. At the beginning of the Industrial Age, the first manufacturing plants opened in 1783. In Cromford the first mechanical spinnery of Europe opened, which grew into the Textilfabrik Cromford, now part of the Rheinisches Industriemuseum (Rhine Industry Museum). In the Napoleonic times, it became part of the city of Berg and in 1815, into the Kingdom of Prussia.

In the communal re-organization of 1929, Ratingen maintained its independence. After relatively small war damage, Ratingen in the 1960s and the 1970s experienced years of growth and development (West Ratingen with 20,000 inhabitants, developed in the late 1960s-1980s). In 1970, before further incorporations the number of inhabitants surpassed 50,000.

Politics
The current mayor of Ratingen is Klaus Konrad Pesch of the Christian Democratic Union (CDU) since 2014. The most recent mayoral election was held on 13 September 2020, with a runoff held on 27 September, and the results were as follows:

! rowspan=2 colspan=2| Candidate
! rowspan=2| Party
! colspan=2| First round
! colspan=2| Second round
|-
! Votes
! %
! Votes
! %
|-
| bgcolor=| 
| align=left| Klaus Konrad Pesch
| align=left| Christian Democratic Union
| 16,433
| 41.5
| 12,874
| 52.1
|-
| 
| align=left| Rainer Vogt
| align=left| Citizens' Union Ratingen
| 7,490
| 18.9
| 11,833
| 47.9
|-
| bgcolor=| 
| align=left| Christian Wiglow
| align=left| Social Democratic Party
| 6,178
| 15.6
|-
| bgcolor=| 
| align=left| Heinz Martin Tönnes
| align=left| Alliance 90/The Greens
| 5,434
| 13.7
|-
| bgcolor=| 
| align=left| Markus Sondermann
| align=left| Free Democratic Party
| 2,344
| 5.9
|-
| bgcolor=| 
| align=left| Hans Michael Gericke
| align=left| Die PARTEI
| 1,029
| 2.6
|-
| bgcolor=| 
| align=left| Manfred Evers
| align=left| Independent
| 700
| 1.8
|-
! colspan=3| Valid votes
! 39,608
! 98.9
! 24,707
! 99.4
|-
! colspan=3| Invalid votes
! 432
! 1.1
! 162
! 0.7
|-
! colspan=3| Total
! 40,040
! 100.0
! 24,869
! 100.0
|-
! colspan=3| Electorate/voter turnout
! 72,748
! 55.0
! 72,741
! 34.2
|-
| colspan=7| Source: City of Ratingen (1st round, 2nd round)
|}

City council

The Ratingen city council governs the city alongside the Mayor. The most recent city council election was held on 13 September 2020, and the results were as follows:

! colspan=2| Party
! Votes
! %
! +/-
! Seats
! +/-
|-
| bgcolor=| 
| align=left| Christian Democratic Union (CDU)
| 13,595
| 34.4
|  0.2
| 24
|  4
|-
| bgcolor=| 
| align=left| Alliance 90/The Greens (Grüne)
| 7,553
| 19.1
|  9.5
| 14
|  9
|-
| 
| align=left| Citizens' Union Ratingen (BU)
| 6,964
| 17.6
|  6.7
| 12
|  2
|-
| bgcolor=| 
| align=left| Social Democratic Party (SPD)
| 6,056
| 15.3
|  5.6
| 11
|  1
|-
| bgcolor=| 
| align=left| Free Democratic Party (FDP)
| 2,479
| 6.3
|  1.7
| 4
|  1
|-
| bgcolor=| 
| align=left| Alternative for Germany (AfD)
| 1,607
| 4.1
|  1.0
| 3
|  1
|-
| bgcolor=| 
| align=left| Die PARTEI
| 1,159
| 2.9
| New
| 2
| New
|-
| colspan=7 bgcolor=lightgrey|
|-
| 
| align=left| The Optimists
| 119
| 0.3
| New
| 0
| New
|-
| bgcolor=| 
| align=left| Independent Manfred Evers
| 40
| 0.1
| New
| 0
| New
|-
! colspan=2| Valid votes
! 39,572
! 98.9
! 
! 
! 
|-
! colspan=2| Invalid votes
! 458
! 1.1
! 
! 
! 
|-
! colspan=2| Total
! 40,030
! 100.0
! 
! 70
!  12
|-
! colspan=2| Electorate/voter turnout
! 72,748
! 55.0
!  3.4
! 
! 
|-
| colspan=7| Source: City of Ratingen
|}

Economy
Several important international enterprises (particularly from the IT industry) as Vodafone, ASUS, Hewlett-Packard, SAP, CEMEX and Esprit maintain branches and/or main centres in Ratingen. It is also the hometown of automotive dealer Gottfried Schultz. On 1 June 2021 Trading Hub Europe, the market area manager for the German natural gas market, was founded in Ratingen.

Sport
Since 1997 the town has hosted the Mehrkampf-Meeting, an annual decathlon and pentathlon meeting.

Twin towns – sister cities

Ratingen is twinned with:

 Maubeuge, France (1958)
 Le Quesnoy, France (1963)
 Vermillion, United States (1969)
 Kokkola, Finland (1989)
 Beelitz, Germany (1990)
 Gagarin, Russia (1998)
 Huishan (Wuxi), China (2007)

Between 1972 and 2016 Ratingen was also twinned to Cramlington/Blyth Valley, United Kingdom.

Notable people
Martin J. Beckmann (1924–2017), economist
Heribert Fassbender (born 1941), sports presenter
Claudia Jung (born 1964), singer
Johann Peter Melchior (1747–1825), sculptor and porcelain designer
Marius Müller-Westernhagen (born 1948), rock musician and actor
Rosemarie Nitribitt (1933–1957), luxury call girl
Dieter Nuhr (born 1960), comedian, author and cabaret artist
Norbert Pohlmann (born 1960), computer scientist
Sönke Wortmann (born 1959), film director

References

External links

Official website
LUX - local community center

Towns in North Rhine-Westphalia
Mettmann (district)
Members of the Hanseatic League